Gisken Wildenvey (23 March 1892 – 14 January 1985) was a Norwegian novelist and author of short stories.

Jonette Pauline Andreassen  was born at Austvågøy at Vågan in Lofoten, Norway.   She was the daughter of farmer Anton Lauritz Andreassen and Inger Martha Jentoft Petersen. The name Gisken had been given to her by the poet Herman Wildenvey whom she married in 1912.   From 1927 they lived at Hergisheim in Stavern.

She made her literary debut in 1925 with the short story collection Bedaarere. She was awarded the Gyldendal's Endowment in 1965.

References

1892 births
1985 deaths
People from Vågan
Norwegian memoirists
Norwegian women short story writers
Norwegian women novelists
Women memoirists
20th-century Norwegian novelists
20th-century Norwegian women writers
20th-century Norwegian short story writers
Burials at the Cemetery of Our Saviour
20th-century memoirists